Alaban or Haloban is the largest village on the island of Tuangku in the Banjak Islands, off Sumatra. It is located on the northern shore of the island.

Populated places in Aceh